Caelostomus sculptipennis is a species of ground beetle in the subfamily Pterostichinae. It was described by Victor Motschulsky in 1859.

References

Caelostomus
Beetles described in 1859